Onychylis is a genus of marsh weevils in the beetle family Brachyceridae. There are about 12 described species in Onychylis.

Species
These 12 species belong to the genus Onychylis:

 Onychylis alternans LeConte, 1876
 Onychylis argentinensis Wibmer & O'Brien, 1986
 Onychylis cretatus Champion, 1902
 Onychylis essigi Tanner, 1954
 Onychylis filicornis Wibmer & O'Brien, 1986
 Onychylis longulus LeConte, 1876
 Onychylis meridionalis Champion, 1902
 Onychylis nigrirostris (Boheman, 1843) (pickerelweed weevil)
 Onychylis parvulus Burke, 1961
 Onychylis setiger Champion, 1902
 Onychylis texanus Burke, 1959
 Onychylis vulgatus Wibmer & O'Brien, 1986

References

Further reading

 
 

Brachyceridae
Articles created by Qbugbot